The term oriental horse refers to the ancient breeds of horses developed in the Middle East, such as the Arabian, Akhal-Teke, Barb, and the now-extinct Turkoman horse.   They tend to be thin-skinned, long-legged, slim in build and more physically refined than other types, but with great endurance. Oriental horses, sometimes referred to as "hot-blooded" breeds, have a level of intelligence that allows them to be athletic, versatile, and learn quickly.  They are bred for agility and speed and are generally considered spirited and bold.

History 

"Oriental" horse, was a tall, slim, refined and agile animal arising in western Asia, adapted to hot, dry climates, and thought to be the progenitor of the modern oriental breeds.  Original classification of ancient horse phenotypes was originally based on body types and conformation, prior to the availability of DNA for research, and has since been superseded by modern studies.    Prior to these developments, the Four Foundations theory suggested the existence of four basic "proto" horses developed with adaptations to their environment prior to domestication by humans.  Another theory suggested that the Oriental horse was a separate species or subspecies (once proposed as Equus agilis though modern taxonomy disputes this ever was a true subspecies). However, modern genetic evidence now points at a single domestication event for a limited number of stallions, combined with repeated restocking of wild mares into domesticated herds, making the later divergence of body types a landrace or selective breeding adaption.

Over the centuries, European breeders imported oriental horses from the Middle East and Northern Africa for breeding when they wanted to incorporate characteristic traits into their best horse racing and light cavalry horses.  Breeders' use of Arabians, and possibly Barb and Turkoman horses, was instrumental in developing the Thoroughbred breed.  Analysis of mitochondrial DNA (mtDNA) in the Andalusian horse shows a clear link to an influx of Barb breeding.  Nearly all other breeds of light and warmblood horses have some oriental ancestry, usually through the Arabian.

See also 

Domestication of the horse

References

Sources 
 
 
 

Types of horse